El Siglo is a regional daily newspaper that is published in Maracay, Aragua, Venezuela. It was founded on March 25, 1974. It circulates in Aragua, Carabobo, Guárico and Miranda states, as well as a small circulation in Caracas. Its current head is Tulio Capriles Hernández.

El Siglo is a morning daily with a daily circulation of 85,000 and a Sunday circulation of 95,000. In 2004, El Siglo's president denounced Didalco Bolívar, the governor of Aragua, in front of the Sociedad Interamericana de Prensa for his having searched El Siglo's premises, and the governor in turn sued the paper for defamation. In January 2007, the paper's circulation was interrupted for three days because of a conflict over organized labor.

Copyright infringement

In 2012, in an article about the Florida Everglades de Florida, the newspaper used a picture owned by from Jefferson Aleman, author of Bicycle Routes 305 - Descubriendo la Florida blog, without permission. The picture was linked from its albums but without citing any source or reference. The image was removed by Google through its Copyright Violation Complaints.

See also
 List of newspapers in Venezuela

References

External links
Official site

Newspapers published in Venezuela
Publications established in 1974
Aragua
Mass media in Maracay
Maracay